Felipe Carlos Osorio y Castelví, 6th conde de Cervellón (1762–1815) was a Spanish noble and military commander.

Early career
Promoted to lieutenant general in 1795, he was appointed interim captain-general of Valencia in December 1807.

Peninsular War

At the start of the war, the Junta Provincial gave him the command of the Army of Valencia. However, his failure to detain Marshal Moncey's advance towards Valencia, leading to that city being attacked in late June 1808, together with his inability to follow up on the Spanish victory by confronting the retreating French troops, which had suffered greatly during the battle, having lost at least 1,200 men, a sixth of Moncey's infantry, led to the Junta relieving him of his command, which was given to González Llamas.

Cervellón was without command for the rest of the war.

Post-war career
After the war, Cervellón was appointed second-in-command of the Army of Valencia, later "acting very prudently" on being given false orders to arrest the captain-general of Valencia, Francisco Javier de Elío.

References

Spanish soldiers
Spanish generals
Spanish commanders of the Napoleonic Wars
Spanish captain generals
1762 births
1815 deaths